Nagukhedi is a village in Dewas district of Madhya Pradesh state of India.

References

Villages in Dewas district